Pat MacLachlan (born 16 March 1928 in Salisbury, Southern Rhodesia now Harare, Zimbabwe) is a former Scotland international rugby union player. In his rugby career he played as a Scrum half.

Rugby union career

Amateur career

MacLachlan played for Oxford University.

He then moved to play for London Scottish.

Provincial career

MacLachlan played provincially in Southern Rhodesia. He played for Southern Rhodesia, Nyasaland and Mashonaland.

International career

He was capped for  4 times in 1954.

He was also capped by the Barbarians.

Outside of rugby

Architect

MacLachlan studied architecture in Cape Town University. He became an Architect in Harare (then Salisbury) and in Blantyre, Malawi.

Teaching

He became a teacher in Canada at Shawnigan Lake School on Vancouver Island, Canada. He later became Headmaster at the school.

He then ran an Independent Schools Service in Hong Kong.

He retired in Canada.

References

1928 births
Living people
Scottish rugby union players
Scotland international rugby union players
Oxford University RFC players
London Scottish F.C. players
Barbarian F.C. players
People from Harare
British expatriates in Southern Rhodesia
British expatriates in South Africa
British expatriates in Malawi
British expatriates in Hong Kong
British emigrants to Canada
Rugby union scrum-halves